The 2004–05 Highland Football League was won by Huntly. Brora Rangers finished bottom.

Table

Results

Highland Football League seasons
5
Scot